Market ward is an electoral ward within Cambridge City Council, to which it elects 3 councillors.

Election results

Wards of Cambridge